Vincenzo Pietropaolo (born in 1951) is a photographer known for photographs that display an empathy for his subjects, who has focussed on documentary photography.
In 2011, Satu Repo wrote about the first of Pietropaolo's photographs to be published in 1971, in This Magazine.  The photos were of immigrant workers on strike outside Artistic Woodwork.  She described the photos as being "...remarkable in both their intensity and intimacy. You were face-to-face with these men, solemn but determined, exercising their right to organize. You couldn't help but share the photographer's clear empathy for them."

Since then, Pietropaolo's photographs have been widely published, have been the subject of gallery shows, and have won awards, including the Cesar E. Chavez Black Eagle Award.

During the 1970s and 1980s, Pietropaolo also worked in the field of city planning, choosing to devote himself exclusively to photography in 1991.

Works

 Vincenzo Pietropaolo; Mark Frutkin (2020). Where Angels Come to Earth. Longbridge Books. .
Vincenzo Pietropaolo (2017). Ritual: Good Friday in Little Italy. Black Dog Publishing. .

References

External links
 Vincenzo Pietropaolo fonds (R11229) at Library and Archives Canada

1951 births
Canadian people of Italian descent
Canadian photographers
Living people